Martina Navratilova was the defending champion but lost in the semifinals to Natasha Zvereva.

Steffi Graf won in the final 6–1, 6–1 against Zvereva.

Seeds
A champion seed is indicated in bold text while text in italics indicates the round in which that seed was eliminated. The top eight seeds received a bye to the second round.

  Steffi Graf (champion)
  Martina Navratilova (semifinals)
 n/a - Zina Garrison, originally seeded third, withdrew from the tournament due to an injury.
  Natasha Zvereva (final)
  Lori McNeil (third round)
  Helen Kelesi (third round)
  Arantxa Sánchez (semifinals)
  Hana Mandlíková (quarterfinals)
  Sandra Cecchini (third round)
  Catarina Lindqvist (third round)
  Bettina Fulco (third round)
  Raffaella Reggi (second round)
  Judith Wiesner (first round)
  Terry Phelps (first round)
 n/a
 n/a

Draw

Finals

Top half

Section 1

Section 2

Bottom half

Section 3

Section 4

References
 1989 Family Circle Cup Draw

Charleston Open
1989 WTA Tour